The Schoolgirls' Own was a British weekly story paper aimed at girls.

The main feature centred on the Morcove School, a "high class" girls' boarding school for the daughters of the aristocratic and the rich, although the school did also accept some pupils from working-class backgrounds. Cookery and needlework were also featured regularly, as it was at that time "considered vital that young girls knew how to cook and sew." All the Morcove stories were by Horace Phillips, using the pen name of "Marjorie Stanton." 

The Friardale Website described Schoolgirls' Own thusly:

In 1936 Schoolgirls' Own was merged into its sister story paper The Schoolgirl and the Morcove stories moved to The Schoolgirl as the backup feature for two years before being quietly dropped. The last Morcove story appeared in the 1938 Schoolgirl's Own annual; Schoolgirls' Own Library reprints of Morcove stories carried on until 1940 when it was canceled as well.

References

1921 establishments in the United Kingdom
1936 disestablishments in the United Kingdom
Magazines established in 1921
Magazines disestablished in 1936
Defunct magazines published in the United Kingdom
Weekly magazines published in the United Kingdom